Vincent Rocco (born June 26, 1987) is a Canadian-born Italian professional ice hockey player who is currently playing for IF Troja/Ljungby in the Swedish second tier HockeyAllsvenskan ice hockey league, previously playing for Alleghe Hockey in the Italian top tier Serie A.

Prior to turning professional, Rocco attended Niagara University, where he played four seasons with the Niagara Purple Eagles men's ice hockey team which then competed in NCAA's Division I CHA conference. In his third year (2007–08) he was named to the CHA First All-Star Team.

Awards and honours

References

External links

1987 births
Living people
Canadian ice hockey forwards
HC Alleghe players
Niagara Purple Eagles men's ice hockey players
Reading Royals players
Canadian expatriate ice hockey players in Italy